The 2014–15 Essex Senior Football League season was the 44th in the history of Essex Senior Football League, a football competition in England.

League table

The league featured 19 clubs which competed in the league last season, along with one new club:
Waltham Forest relegated from the Isthmian League

Also, London APSA changed name to Newham.

League table

Results

References

External links
 Essex Senior League official site

Essex Senior Football League seasons
9